Srungadhara Agraharam is a village in Rowthulapudi Mandal, Kakinada district in the state of Andhra Pradesh in India.

Geography 

Demographics 
Srungadhara Agraharam Village has a population of 2,618, out of which 1358 are male and 1260 are female. Population of children below 6 years of age are 376. The literacy rate of the village is 47.90%.

References 

Villages in Rowthulapudi mandal